Anthonomus convictus is a species of true weevil in the family of beetles known as Curculionidae. It is found in North America, where it lives within the galls of Heliozela aesella.

References

Further reading

External links

Curculioninae
Articles created by Qbugbot
Beetles described in 1972